Søren Espersen (born 20 July 1953 in Svenstrup) is a Danish politician, journalist, and author, who was elected as a member of the Folketing for the Danish People's Party in 2005. He was also the party's foreign affairs spokesperson. and former chairman of Udenrigspolitisk Nævn. In 2022, he switched affiliation to the Denmark Democrats and was re-elected to the Folketing.

Political career
Espersen was a candidate for the Progress Party from 1992-1995. Espersen was first elected into parliament at the 2005 Danish general election. He was reelected in the 2007 election. He was elected again in 2011 with 6,358 votes, in 2015 with 14,482 votes and in 2019 with 5,930 votes.

In an interview with a Danish television station in 2017, Søren Espersen expressed that he would consider a connection between southern Schleswig and Denmark to be desirable, with the Danish-German border being relocated to the Eider.

Bibliography
Israels selvstændighedskrig – og de danske frivillige (2007)
Valdemar Rørdam ‒ Nationalskjald og Landsforræder (2003)
Danmarks fremtid – dit land, dit valg… (2001, co-author)

References

External links
 

1953 births
Living people
People from Aalborg Municipality
Danish writers
Danish People's Party politicians
Members of the Folketing 2005–2007
Members of the Folketing 2007–2011
Members of the Folketing 2011–2015
Members of the Folketing 2015–2019
Members of the Folketing 2019–2022
Denmark Democrats politicians
Members of the Folketing 2022–2026